The 2005 FIFA Club World Championship (officially known as the FIFA Club World Championship Toyota Cup Japan 2005 for sponsorship reasons) was the second FIFA Club World Championship, a football competition organised by FIFA for the champion clubs of the six continental confederations. It was the first to be held after by the merger between the Intercontinental Cup and the FIFA Club World Championship (which had been played in a first edition in 2000).

The tournament was held in Japan from 11 to 18 December 2005 and won by Brazilian club São Paulo, who defeated English side Liverpool 1–0 in the final.

Background
The 2005 tournament was created as a merger between the Intercontinental Cup and the earlier FIFA Club World Championships. The previous of these had been running as an annual tournament between the champions of Europe and South America since 1960; the latter had undergone just one tournament, the 2000 FIFA Club World Championship. The 2001 tournament had been cancelled when FIFA's marketing partner ISL went bankrupt. To celebrate the marriage between the two competitions, a new trophy was introduced by FIFA.

As a result of this merger, the tournament was conceived as being smaller than the original Club World Championship, which had lasted two weeks, yet building on the one game format of the Intercontinental Cup. Six clubs were invited to take part in the tournament, one representing each regional football confederation. The competition's name, which was the simple union between the name of the two previous merging competitions, was evidently too long, and was going to be reduced the following year, becoming the FIFA Club World Cup.

Format
The competition was a knockout tournament so each team played two or three matches. The champions of the four "weaker" confederations played in the quarter-finals; the losers played in a fifth place play-off. The winners were then joined by the European and South American champions in the semi-finals; the losers played in a third place play-off.

The matches were held in Tokyo's National (Olympic) Stadium, Toyota Stadium in Toyota, Aichi, near Nagoya and the International Stadium in Yokohama, where the final was played. For marketing purposes it was known as the FIFA Club World Championship Toyota Cup.

Qualified teams

It was all six clubs' first appearance in the FIFA Club World Championship.

Venues
Tokyo, Yokohama and Toyota were the three cities to serve as venues for the 2005 FIFA Club World Cup.

Squads

Match officials

Matches

Quarter-finals

Semi-finals

Match for fifth place

Match for third place

Final

Goalscorers

Reaction
The tournament was quite well received, although some commentators have stated that, excluding São Paulo and Liverpool, the quality of football was quite poor leading to a view that it might have been better retaining the two continent format of the European/South American Cup.

Awards

References

External links
FIFA Club World Championship Toyota Cup Japan 2005, FIFA.com
2005 FIFA Club World Championship Official Site (Archived)
FIFA Technical Report 

 
2005
2005 in Japanese football
2005
2005 in association football
2005 in Brazilian football
2005–06 in Costa Rican football
2005 in Australian soccer
2005–06 in English football
2005–06 in Saudi Arabian football